"Walk Along John", also known as "Oh, Come Along John", is an American song written for the blackface minstrel show stage in 1843. The lyrics of the song are typical of those of the early minstrel show. They are largely nonsense about a black man who boasts about his exploits.

The chorus is:

"Walk Along John" is a likely source of inspiration for the later minstrel hit, "Old Dan Tucker". Verses in both songs are quite similar, such as this one:

Compare with this verse, commonly found in versions of "Old Dan Tucker":

Notes

References

 Lomax, John A., and Lomax, Alan (1934). American Ballads and Folk Songs. New York: The Macmillan Company.
 Mahar, William J. (1999). Behind the Burnt Cork Mask: Early Blackface Minstrelsy and Antebellum American Popular Culture. Chicago: University of Illinois Press.
 Rammel, Hal (1990). Nowhere in America: The Big Rock Candy Mountain and Other Comic Utopias. Urbana, Illinois: University of Illinois Press.

Songs about trains

1843 songs
Blackface minstrel songs
Songwriter unknown